Veronica Varlow is a burlesque dancer, pin-up model, actress, producer, and performance artist based in Brooklyn, New York. She was the owner of the former internet boutique Danger Dame, which specialized in clothing inspired by burlesque, cabaret, the 1940s and 1950s. More recently, Veronica has revamped her website in accordance with her focus on teaching magic and tarot - the website is now called Love Witch and features a new store named Love Witch Potions and Devotions. The new store offers incense blends, magical jewelry and other curios.

Biography
Varlow began her career after being attacked in the face by a rottweiler in December 2003. While under anesthesia during eight hours of surgery, she realized that the only reason she was not following her true dreams was because she feared other people's judgments. Determined to not condemn herself to a meaningless life, she left her cubicle life behind and started performing worldwide.

Varlow has performed internationally as one of Emilie Autumn's Bloody Crumpets as "The Naughty Veronica" since 2007. Varlow has performed for events held by designer Marc Jacobs, supermodel Heidi Klum, The Whitney Museum and for NYT Best-Selling Vampire Novelist, Melissa de la Cruz.  The Gothamist said of her, "Veronica Varlow courts danger, or, at the very least, projects an image of a siren so alluring you simply can't resist her, even when you know you're headed straight for hell (or jail)."  She was also called "A modern-day Marlene Dietrich" by The Times.  In 2013, she was named one of the 12 "Hottest Ladies of Burlesque" alongside such icons as Bettie Page, Lili St. Cyr, and Sherry Britton.

Veronica Varlow is a renowned witch descended from five generations of Czech-Romani witches. She calls upon the ancient and hidden Czech-Romani magic passed down from her grandmother Helen’s lineage and infuses it with her own signature sorcery to help people awaken and amplify their truest self.

On November 2, 2021, Varlow released her first book, Bohemian Magick: Witchcraft and Secret Spells to Electrify Your Life, through HarperCollins.

Along with a rich, colorful selection of art, illustrations, and photography, Bohemian Magick begins with a step-by-step course in Varlow’s method of spellcasting, The School of Spectaculus. It offers advice on setting the intention of a spell, how to imbue the words and spell itself with a personal signature, and how to send it out to the world with great power. The balance of the book offers a series of Initiations, each devoted to a particular theme: self-confidence, healing self-empowerment, self-love, and romantic love. It’s filled with personal stories and tales from the Witch Camps she holds every summer—and all combine to create a book that feels like a rare, beloved treasure filled with the special secrets and methods of a lineage witch.

Film and TV appearances
In the fall of 2008, Varlow participated as a coach for Andrea Martin in MTV's Emmy-winning show, MADE. She appeared in the 2009 film Exposed and in the 2010 short documentary Dr Sketchy's Anti-Art School by Peter Bolte.

She featured in Emilie Autumn's music video for the song 'Fight Like A Girl' in 2013.

Personal life 
On October 31, 2020, Varlow married David Garfinkel, with whom she runs a coven at the Chelsea Hotel in NYC.

She currently resides in Brooklyn, NYC and also owns a house in Woodstock, NY called Curiosa (affectionately referred to as 'Magic House') where she runs yearly Witch Camp retreats.

References

External links

Love Witch - Veronica Varlow's website and internet boutique.
Love Witch Academy - Veronica Varlow's Witch Academy.
Instagram
 Facebook
 Twitter

1979 births
People from Brooklyn
American neo-burlesque performers
American female dancers
American dancers
Actresses from New York City
Female models from New York (state)
Living people
Date of birth missing (living people)
Place of birth missing (living people)
Dancers from New York (state)
21st-century American women